= Corbin Head Formation =

Geological formation in Newfoundland, Canada

- Stratigraphic range: Neoproterozoic
- Type: Formation
- Unit of: Burin Group

Lithology
- Primary: Volcaniclastics

Location
- Region: Newfoundland
- Country: Canada
- Occurrence of the Corbin Head Formation in southeastern Newfoundland

The Corbin Head Formation is a formation cropping out in Newfoundland.
